Linda Line was the brand name of Lindaliini AS, an Estonian ferry company operating between Tallinn, Estonia and Helsinki, Finland. Its high-speed passenger ferry Karolin was the fastest vessel sailing between the two cities, linking Tallinn's Linnahall terminal and Helsinki's Makasiini terminal in 100 minutes. The company was founded in 1997. It ceased operations in November 2017 and filed for bankruptcy in May 2018.

History

Lindaliini AS was founded in 1997 as the successor of shipping company Inreko Laeva AS. It started operations with a fleet of three hydrofoils, which were able to make the journey between Tallinn and Helsinki in an hour and a half, much faster than the conventional ferries serving the same route. 

Starting in 2007, the hydrofoils were replaced with catamarans, which were less expensive to maintain and had better seaworthiness. Still catamarans are more dependent on the weather than traditional vessels, and Linda Line had a policy of cancelling departures when wind speeds exceeded 15 metres per second and/or wave heights were over 3 metres.

In 2017, Linda Lines announced the delivery of a new vessel for 2018. Operations ended in November 2017, and Merilin and Karolin were sold off. The announced delivery of the new vessel was initially announced to be delayed. The company eventually filed for bankruptcy in May 2018.

Fleet

{| class="wikitable"
! Ship
! Line
! Type
! Purchased/Delivered
! In service
! Sold
! Current name
! Notes
|- style="background:white; color:black"
|Karolin
|Tallinn–Helsinki
|Catamaran
|2008
|2009–2017
|2017
|
|Built in Australia in 2000, damaged in a storm in summer 2008. She had a capacity of 353 passengers and a maximum speed of 37 knots.
|- style="background:white; color:black"
|Merilin
|Tallinn–Helsinki
|Catamaran
|2007
|2007–2017
|2017
|Eldorado
|Linda Line’s largest high-speed vessel
|-style="background:white; color:black"
|Juku
|Tallinn–Aegna
|Passenger ship
|2008
|2008–2009
|
|
|Acquired by AS Kihnu Veeteed.
|- style="background:white; color:black"
|Jaanika
|Tallinn–Helsinki
|Hydrofoil
|1997
|1997–2007
|2008
|Hermes
|Now serving the Sochi–Trabzon line in Russia.
|- style="background:white; color:black"
|Laura
|Tallinn–Helsinki
|Hydrofoil
|1997
|1997–2006
|2007
|Marine Princess
|Later served the Nessebar–Istanbul line, now decommissioned.
|- style="background:white; color:black"
|Liisa
|Tallinn–Helsinki
|Double decker hydrofoil
|1997
|1997–1998
|1998
|Delfini XXX
|Now operating in Greece under the ownership of Thirian Coastlines Shipping Co.
|- style="background:white; color:black"
|Linda Express
|Tallinn–Helsinki
|Foiling catamaran
|2002
|2002–2004
|2004
|Shi Ji Kuai Hang
|Constantly experiencing problems, it was the world’s fastest passenger ship at the time.
|- style="background:yellow; color:black"
|Sea Flower
|Tallinn–Helsinki
|Trimaran
| –
| –
| –
|Sea Flower
|Purchase planned for 2008/9 but not completed.
|}

In 2008, Linda Line planned to purchase a trimaran-type vessel for the Tallinn–Helsinki route, intended to replace hydrofoil Jaanika. The trimaran would have been safer and slightly larger than Merilin. The launch was initially planned for April 2009, but this was soon postponed to June 26, and the purchase was ultimately not completed for unknown reasons. Linda Line started the 2009 season with two catamarans, Merilin and the newly acquired Karolin.

Tallinn–Helsinki route

In Tallinn, the Linda Line high-speed ferries departed from Linnahall terminal and in Helsinki from Makasiini terminal. Both ships had a Linda class and a VIP class separated from the rest of the cabin, and the company offered a variety of hotel and leisure packages in Helsinki.

Tallinn–Aegna route

On April 16, 2008, the Tallinn City Government decided to award the contract for the Tallinn-Aegna shipping line to Linda Line. The decision was also helped by a decision made at the end of March to have the route depart from Linnahall terminal instead of Pirita. The line was operated by the small passenger ship Juku. At the beginning of 2010, the right to operate the route with Juku was granted to AS Kihnu Veeteed.

Fleet by year

{| class="wikitable"
|-
! Years
! Ships
|-
|1997
|Jaanika, Laura, Liisa
|-
|1998–2001
|Jaanika, Laura
|-
|2002–2004
|Jaanika, Laura, Linda Express
|-
|2005–2006
|Jaanika, Laura
|-
|2007
|Jaanika, Merilin
|-
|2008
|Merilin
|-
|2009
|Merilin, Karolin
|-
|2010–
|Merilin, Karolin
|-
|2017
|Karolin
|-
|2018
| –
|}

References

Ferry companies of Estonia
Estonian brands
2017 disestablishments in Estonia
Estonian companies established in 1997
Transport companies established in 1997